The 1953 All-Southwest Conference football team consists of American football players chosen by various organizations for All-Southwest Conference teams for the 1953 college football season.  The selectors for the 1953 season included the Associated Press (AP) and the United Press (UP).  Players selected as first-team players by both the AP and UP are designated in bold.

All Southwest selections

Backs
 Don Ellis, Texas A&M (AP-1 [QB]; UP-1)
 Lamar McHan, Arkansas (AP-1 [HB]; UP-1)
 Jerry Coody, Baylor (AP-1 [HB]; UP-1)
 Kosse Johnson, Rice (AP-1; UP-1)

Ends
 Carlton Massey, Texas (AP-1; UP-1)
 Floyd Sagely, Arkansas (AP-1; UP-1)

Tackles
 Dick Chapman, Rice (AP-1; UP-1)
 Jim Ray Smith, Baylor (AP-1; UP-1) (College Football Hall of Fame)

Guards
 Morgan Williams, TCU (AP-1; UP-1)
 Phil Branch, Texas (AP-1; UP-1)

Centers
 Leo Rucka, Rice (AP-1; UP-1)

Key
AP = Associated Press

UP = United Press

Bold = Consensus first-team selection of both the AP and UP

See also
1953 College Football All-America Team

References

All-Southwest Conference
All-Southwest Conference football teams